Guajataca Tunnel is a railroad tunnel that connected the town of Isabela and Quebradillas, Puerto Rico. The tunnel is one of the most significant work of the remnants of the national railway system that connected the island during the first half of the twentieth century.  In 2000, the Government of Puerto Rico declared it a historical monument.

History
The American Railroad Co. of Puerto Rico began construction of the tunnel around 1904 during the expansion of the northern line towards the west of the island. The tunnel connected the towns of Quebradillas and Isabela on the Guajataca River canyon. The construction was completed with the excavation of two tunnels on each side of the canyon.

The tunnel is open to the public but it is fairly isolated. The tunnel leads to "Guajataca beach" known for its white sand, raging surf, and dangerous turbulent waters.

Concerts are sometimes held at the Guajataca Tunnel.
In 2019, virtual tours of Guajataca Tunnel, were organized by Discover Puerto Rico, the marketing arm of the Puerto Rico Department of Tourism.

Gallery

See also

Puente Blanco

References

External links

Video, photos and visiting information

Historic American Engineering Record in Puerto Rico
Isabela, Puerto Rico
Railway tunnels in Puerto Rico
Tunnels completed in 1904
1904 establishments in Puerto Rico